George Augustus Lumley-Saunderson, 5th Earl of Scarbrough (22 September 1753 – 5 September 1807), styled Viscount Lumley until 1782, was a British peer and politician who sat in the House of Commons from 1774 to 1780.

Background
Scarbrough was the eldest son of Richard Lumley-Saunderson, 4th Earl of Scarbrough, and Barbara Savile, daughter of  Sir George Savile, 7th Baronet. He was educated at Eton College from 1764 to 1770 and was admitted at King's College, Cambridge in 1771.

Political career
Scarbrough was elected in a contest as Member of Parliament for Lincoln on his father's interest at the 1774 general election. He stood for Lincoln again in 1780, but was defeated. In 1782 he succeeded his father in the earldom and entered the House of Lords.

Later life
Lord Scarbrough died in September 1807, aged 53. He never married and was succeeded by his younger brother, Richard.

References

1753 births
1807 deaths
People educated at Eton College
Alumni of King's College, Cambridge
Members of the Parliament of Great Britain for English constituencies
British MPs 1774–1780
Politics of Lincoln, England
Earls of Scarbrough